The Ružička large-ring synthesis or Ružička reaction  or Ružička cyclization  is an organic reaction in which a dicarboxylic acid is converted to a cyclic ketone via heating with a  thorium oxide catalyst. The reaction is named after Lavoslav Ružička, who invented it in 1926.

The reaction has been applied in the synthesis of Exaltone, a low-toxicity synthetic musk.

References

Substitution reactions
Name reactions